Progreso is a city in Hidalgo County, Texas. The population was 5,507 at the time of the 2010 United States Census. It is part of the McAllen–Edinburg–Mission and Reynosa–McAllen metropolitan areas.

Geography

Progreso is located at  (26.093724, –97.957530), south of Weslaco on FM 1015 and HWY 281. It borders the Mexican town of Nuevo Progreso, formerly known as Las Flores.

Demographics

2020 census

As of the 2020 United States census, there were 4,807 people, 1,323 households, and 1,243 families residing in the city.

2000 census
As of the census of 2000, there were 4,851 people, 1,023 households, and 951 families residing in the city. The population density was 1,626.0 people per square mile (628.5/km2). There were 1,127 housing units at an average density of 377.8 per square mile (146.0/km2). The racial makeup of the city was 89.01% White, 0.10% Native American, 0.04% Asian, 10.33% from other races, and 0.52% from two or more races. Hispanic or Latino of any race were 99.01% of the population.

There were 1,023 households, out of which 63.0% had children under the age of 18 living with them, 71.8% were married couples living together, 15.7% had a female householder with no husband present, and 7.0% were non-families. 6.4% of all households were made up of individuals, and 3.2% had someone living alone who was 65 years of age or older. The average household size was 4.73 and the average family size was 4.94.

In the city, the population was spread out, with 42.5% under the age of 18, 12.9% from 18 to 24, 25.2% from 25 to 44, 13.3% from 45 to 64, and 6.0% who were 65 years of age or older. The median age was 22 years. For every 100 females, there were 101.8 males. For every 100 females age 18 and over, there were 93.3 males.

The median income for a household in the city was $18,184, and the median income for a family was $18,313. Males had a median income of $14,961 versus $13,542 for females. The per capita income for the city was $4,789. About 51.4% of families and 50.9% of the population were below the poverty line, including 56.4% of those under age 18 and 37.2% of those age 65 or over.

Education
Progreso is served by the Progreso Independent School District. In addition, South Texas Independent School District operates magnet schools that serve the community.

Government and infrastructure
The United States Postal Service operates the Progreso Post Office.

See also

Progreso Texas Port of Entry

References

Cities in Hidalgo County, Texas
Cities in Texas
Texas populated places on the Rio Grande